Grevillea flexuosa, commonly known as zigzag grevillea or tangled grevillea, is a species of flowering plant in the family Proteaceae and is endemic to the south-west of Western Australia. It is an erect shrub with divided leaves, these lobes with three to five triangular lobes, and cylindrical clusters of cream-coloured to pale yellow flowers.

Description
The leaves on flowering branches are shorter and narrower. The edges of the leaf lobes curve downwards and both surfaces are glabrous.

Taxonomy
This species was first formally described in 1839 by John Lindley who gave it the name Anadenia flexousa in his A Sketch of the Vegetation of the Swan River Colony. Lindley referred to it there as "a singular species, allied to A. pulchella, with most curious zigzag leaves". In 1845, Anadenia was demoted to a section of Grevillea by Carl Meissner, and this species was thus transferred to Grevillea as Grevillea flexuosa (Lindl.) Meisn.. The specific epithet (flexuosa) means "zig-zag", referring to the leaf lobes.

Distribution and habitat
Grevillea flexuosa is only known from a few locations near Toodyay and Stoneville where it grows in heath on hilltops, on slopes and in gullies, in the Jarrah Forest biogeographic region of south-western Western Australia.

Conservation status
Zigzag grevillea is listed as "vulnerable" under the Australian Government Environment Protection and Biodiversity Conservation Act 1999 and as "threatened" by the Western Australian Government Department of Biodiversity, Conservation and Attractions. The main threats to the species include dieback caused by Phytophthora cinnamomi, land clearing, grazing and weed invasion.

References

flexuosa
Endemic flora of Western Australia
Eudicots of Western Australia
Proteales of Australia
Endangered flora of Australia
Taxa named by John Lindley
Plants described in 1839